Ginebra may refer to:

Ginebra, Valle del Cauca, a municipality in the department of Valle del Cauca, Colombia
Ginebra San Miguel, Philippines-based diversified beverage company majority-owned by San Miguel Corporation.
Barangay Ginebra San Miguel, a Philippines basketball team